The  is a fictional kingdom in Nintendo's Mario series. It is the setting of most of the main-series Mario games, though with an inconsistent presentation. There is no established canon regarding the topography of the Mario universe, and many related areas are not certain to be part of the Mushroom Kingdom.

Overview 
Within the fictional universe of Mario games, the Mushroom Kingdom is a principality ruled by Princess Peach (also known as Princess Toadstool) who is the head of state. However, the manual for the first game in the series mentions Peach’s father as the “Mushroom King” who somewhat rules over the Kingdom. Peach debuted in the instruction manual for Super Mario Bros. (1985), with Toadsworth appearing as her steward in later games.

A very small number of Mushroom Kingdom citizens are humans, such as Peach herself, Mario, and Luigi, with the majority of the population being portrayed as Toad citizens. Other characters that populate the Mushroom Kingdom in Mario games include Yoshi, Goombas, Koopas, and Boos. 

The Kingdom's most prominent currency are coins (of various colors) which are featured in nearly every Mario-related game. Brown brick blocks and golden "question-mark blocks", are spread across the land which may contain coins or power-ups. The main way of transportation in the Mushroom Kingdom is Warp Pipes which takes you from one place to another. Some pipes cover only a short distance (such as between the overworld and underground), while other pipes are linked to entirely different worlds. Other warp tools and areas have been introduced in games, such as the secret "Warp Whistle" in Super Mario Bros. 3 and cannons in New Super Mario Bros.

Locations

Princess Peach's Castle
Princess Peach's Castle is a large Central European-style red-and-white castle. It is decorated with stained-glass above the main doors which represent the princess. Inhabited by the princess and her Toad retainers, the castle first appeared in-game in Princess Toadstool’s Castle Run (1990) but is more prominently featured in Super Mario RPG (1996) and is the central hub in Super Mario 64. Its design has remained relatively consistent since. In games such as Paper Mario, Mario & Luigi: Partners in Time, Super Mario Galaxy, and Super Mario Odyssey (where it is the Mushroom Kingdom's capital city), and the Mario Kart series, Peach's Castle is generally located in the center of the kingdom. It can serve as the final world or as headquarters, as a navigation hub or as a feature access point. In the Mario Kart series, the castle is often seen either in the background of the course or as a part of it where you drive through the castle. The latter has been seen in entries such as Mario Kart 7 and Mario Kart Arcade GP DX.

Mario's house
Mario's house is the home of Mario and his brother Luigi in the Mario series. It is sometimes located nearby Peach's Castle, and other times outside the entrance to the Mushroom Kingdom, such as in Super Mario Galaxy.

Toad Town
Toad Town is the capital of the Mushroom Kingdom as seen in the Paper Mario and Mario & Luigi series. It is generally located next to Peach's Castle. Several Mario species reside in the city, in particular Toads.

Bowser's Castle
Bowser's Castle is the abode of Bowser, arch-villain of the Super Mario video games. The castle has often been destroyed and rebuilt and appears differently in each game it is featured in. It is usually filled with lava pits, booby traps, and Bowser's minions. Variations on Bowser's Castle appear in nearly every Mario game, and every Mario Kart game features at least one course titled "Bowser's Castle" or "Bowser Castle". The plot of New Super Mario Bros. U involves Bowser taking over Peach's Castle and making it look like his own. However, Bowser's Castle is often depicted in its own kingdom, that being Bowser's kingdom in the games.

Landscapes 

The Mushroom Kingdom has been revamped several times over the course of the Mario games, similar to the kingdom of Hyrule in The Legend of Zelda series. In Super Mario Bros., for example, the Mushroom Kingdom encompasses 32 different levels of varying terrain. Super Mario Bros. 3 expands on this concept with a map screen to add topography to the kingdom. The games do not follow these landscape variants exactly, but still are recurring themes in the Mario series. For example, even though Super Mario World is set in Dinosaur Land, its geography very similar to the Mushroom Kingdom. The paintings that lead to the different levels in Super Mario 64 follow this idea.

In other games and media
The Super Smash Bros. series includes four different stages based on the Mushroom Kingdom. The original Super Smash Bros. includes the unlockable stage "Mushroom Kingdom" which is graphically based on the original Super Mario Bros. Super Smash Bros. Melee includes a re-vamped "Mushroom Kingdom" which omitted Piranha Plants and warp pipes from the original stage, and its stage "Mushroom Kingdom II" is based on the Subcon setting of Super Mario Bros. 2. Super Smash Bros. Brawl includes the level "Mushroomy Kingdom", which primarily appears as an abandoned, derelict version of "World 1-1" of Super Mario Bros.

The fictional land is present in the Super Nintendo World theme park.

Theyab Al-Tamimi created a comedy fanbook, Science of the Mushroom Kingdom, exploring the species of flora in the Mushroom Kingdom; this was later recommended to readers by Kotaku.

See also
Hyrule

References

Fictional countries
Fictional kingdoms
Mario (franchise)
Video game locations